The 2023 World Baseball Classic Pool D was the fourth of four pools of the 2023 World Baseball Classic that took place from March 11–15 at LoanDepot Park in Miami, Florida. The top two teams automatically qualify for the top eight knockout stage, with the entire bottom half of the bracket in Miami. The teams in this pool consisted of Dominican Republic, Israel, newcomer Nicaragua, Puerto Rico, and Venezuela.

With Venezuela winning all games and advancing to the quarterfinals as pool winners, the game between Puerto Rico and the Dominican Republic on the last day determined the second quarterfinal spot, with the winner advancing and the loser being eliminated. Puerto Rico defeated the Dominican Republic 5–2 to advance, with celebrations cut short as closer Edwin Díaz suffered an injury during the celebration. Nicaragua lost all games and was relegated to the 2026 World Baseball Classic qualifiers.

Teams

Standings

Summary

|}

Matches

Nicaragua vs Puerto Rico

Dominican Republic vs Venezuela

Nicaragua vs Israel

Venezuela vs Puerto Rico

Dominican Republic vs Nicaragua

Israel vs Puerto Rico

Nicaragua vs Venezuela

Israel vs Dominican Republic

Venezuela vs Israel

Puerto Rico vs Dominican Republic

Statistics
Source:

Leading hittiers

Power

Efficiency

Leading pitchers

Notes

References

Pool D
World Baseball Classic Pool D
2020s in Miami
Baseball competitions in Miami
International baseball competitions hosted by the United States
International sports competitions in Florida
World Baseball Classic Pool D